The Villa Traversi Tittoni, or Villa Cusani Traversi Tittoni is a rural palace in Desio, northern Italy.

An original palace at the site was built by the  aristocratic Cusani family. The structure was rebuilt and redesigned first in 1776 by Giuseppe Piermarini in a Neoclassical style.  In 1817, the villa was sold to the lawyer Giovanni Traversi; beginning in 1840, the interiors were refurbished and the façade added by  Pelagio Palagi. The palace has extensive gardens, designed in a free nineteenth century "English style". In 1900, the Villa became property of Tommaso Tittoni, a statesman and diplomat. After World War II, the house functioned as a seminary, until, in 1975, it was acquired by the comune of Desio.

The villa now hosts a library and museum, named after Giuseppe Scalvini.

Sources
 LombardiaBeniCulturali: La Villa Traversi Tittoni a Desio

Tittoni Traversi, Desio
Neoclassical architecture in Lombardy
Houses completed in the 18th century
Giuseppe Piermarini buildings